Duophonique is a compilation album of famous songs by Canadian singer Roch Voisine in French performed as duos with other artists with all new, and often symphonic orchestra arrangements. It was released on 25 February 2013 containing 13 tracks, 11 of which are duo interpretations of well-known Roch Voisine songs, and one original song called "Montréal-Québec" done in two versions, one as a duo with Marilou and another as a solo pop version.  The pop version was previously released on the Canadian edition of Confidences.

The Canadian edition was released on 29 October 2013 containing 12 tracks.  Some of the tracks are as performed on the European edition, while others are performed with different artists.  The order of tracks differs from the European edition, and track 12 ("Pourtant") was not featured on the European edition.

Track listing

Charts

References

2013 compilation albums
Roch Voisine albums
French-language compilation albums